Fernando Henrique dos Anjos (born 25 November 1983), known as Fernando Henrique, is a Brazilian footballer who plays as a goalkeeper for Portuguesa.

Fernando Henrique notably represented Fluminense, spending nine full campaigns in the first team and being a regular starter in the vast majority of his spell.

International career
Fernando Henrique has also been capped at under-20 level for Brazil, and made his first full appearance for senior side in 6–0 win over Haiti in Port-au-Prince on 18 August 2004, as a second-half substitute for Júlio César.

Career statistics
.

Honours

Club
Fluminense
Taça Rio: 2005
Campeonato Carioca: 2005
Copa do Brasil: 2007
Campeonato Brasileiro Série A: 2010

Ceará
Campeonato Cearense: 2011, 2012, 2013, 2018

América de Natal
Campeonato Potiguar: 2014

International
Brazil U20
FIFA U-20 World Cup: 2003

References

External links

1983 births
Living people
People from Bauru
Brazilian footballers
Association football goalkeepers
Campeonato Brasileiro Série A players
Campeonato Brasileiro Série B players
Campeonato Brasileiro Série C players
Campeonato Brasileiro Série D players
Fluminense FC players
Ceará Sporting Club players
América Futebol Clube (RN) players
Esporte Clube Internacional de Lages players
Clube do Remo players
Villa Nova Atlético Clube players
Clube de Regatas Brasil players
Esporte Clube Santo André players
Brasiliense Futebol Clube players
Oeste Futebol Clube players
Associação Portuguesa de Desportos players
Pan American Games medalists in football
Pan American Games silver medalists for Brazil
Footballers at the 2003 Pan American Games
Brazil under-20 international footballers
Medalists at the 2003 Pan American Games
Footballers from São Paulo (state)